Jacopo Tumicelli or Tunicelli (1784– January 11, 1825) was an Italian painter.

Biography
He was born in Villafranca di Verona near Verona. He initially studied under Saverio della Rosa, and afterwards in the academy of Milan, and was a prominent portrait miniature painter of his day.

References

1784 births
1825 deaths
18th-century Italian painters
Italian male painters
19th-century Italian painters
Painters from Milan
Painters from Verona
Portrait miniaturists
19th-century Italian people
19th-century Italian male artists
18th-century Italian male artists